Hanna-Riikka Sallinen ( Nieminen, previously Välilä; born 12 June 1973) is a Finnish retired ice hockey, bandy, rinkball, and pesäpallo player. She is one of the most highly decorated players to have ever competed in international ice hockey. 

Sallinen played sixteen seasons with the Finland women's national ice hockey team and earned two Olympic bronze medals, one World Championship silver and six bronze medals, and three European Championship gold medals. In 2007, Sallinen was one of the first two women inducted into the Finnish Hockey Hall of Fame, along with defenceman Marianne Ihalainen. She was inducted into the IIHF Hall of Fame on 21 May 2010 in Cologne, Germany as part of the World Championship festivities; she was only the fourth woman and the first European woman to receive this honor. She is currently the leading all-time European scorer in World Championships and Olympics.

Sallinen's bronze medal at the 2018 Olympics in PyeongChang made her the oldest player to ever win an Olympic medal in ice hockey, replacing her compatriot Teemu Selänne who set the record at the 2014 Winter Olympics after winning bronze in the men's ice hockey tournament at age 43. Sallinen was awarded the medal at age 44, twenty years after she first won an Olympic medal in the inaugural women's Olympic hockey tournament.

In 2022 she became the ninth woman player named to the Hockey Hall of Fame; she is the first woman not born in North America to be so honoured.

Ice hockey playing career
Sallinen played eleven seasons in the Naisten SM-sarja and was a five time Finnish Champion, first in 1988–89 with Etelä-Vantaan Urheilijat (EVU), then in 1993–94 with the Keravan Shakers, and in 1996–97, 1997–98, and 2015–16 with JYP Jyväskylä Naiset. She scored 201 goals and notched 194 assists (395 points) in 135 regular season games, averaging 2.93 points per game across her Naisten SM-sarja career, and appeared in 41 Naisten SM-sarja playoff games, scoring 86 points, (36 goals and 50 assists).

In 2016, she joined HV71 in the SDHL. She would captain the team from 2017 to 2019, scoring a total of 119 points in 92 games. She was suspended for four games in the 2018-19 playoffs after bodychecking a Leksands IF player.

She announced her retirement from competition in April 2019, at age 46, shortly after achieving silver at the 2019 IIHF Women's World Championship.

International ice hockey career
Sallinen represented Finland at three IIHF Women's European Championships, eight IIHF World Women's Championships, and four Olympics. Over her international career she would score 109 goals, 95 assists for 204 points while accumulating only 24 PIMs.

She made her international debut at the 1989 Women's European Championship. She was also a member of Team Finland during the first IIHF-sanctioned international Women's World Ice Hockey Championship in 1990. Leading all players in scoring at the 1994 IIHF Women's World Championship, she was named the tournament's Best Forward. After leading all players in scoring at the 1997 IIHF Women's World Championship, she became the first woman to be named a top-3 forward in three consecutive World Championships.

In her first Olympics in 1998 she led the tournament in scoring, amassing 12 points (7 goals & 5 assists) in six games and leading the Finnish team to the bronze medal. Sallinen would also lead the Finnish national team to three European Championship titles and six IIHF World Women's Championship bronze medals and one silver.

In August 2013, the IIHF reported that she was attempting a comeback and in December 2013, following several matches in the Naisten SM-sarja, she was selected for the Finnish women's team for the Sochi Olympics. She made the Finnish Olympic team again for the 2018 Olympics, helping Finland to a bronze medal.

She scored 4 points in 7 games at the 2019 IIHF Women's World Championship as Finland won their first silver medal in history. During the tournament, she averaged 19:58 time-on-ice, second on the team. The logo for the Championship, held in Finland, was designed by Michelle Karvinen in tribute to her career.

Rinkball career
In rinkball, Sallinen won the European Championship gold in 1989.

Personal life
Sallinen was born Hanna-Riikka Nieminen on 12 June 1973 in Jyväskylä, Central Finland. She was raised in a sports-oriented home; her father and two older brothers were also successful athletes. Her father, Eero, was a Finnish Champion pesäpallo player in the 1960s. Lasse Nieminen, Sallinen’s eldest brother, played nearly 500 games with JYP Jyväskylä in the Liiga and currently serves as assistant coach to the JYP U16 juniors team. Juha “Jussi” Nieminen, Sallinen’s second eldest brother, played twelve seasons in the Superpesis with Jyväskylän Kiri.

Sallinen is a physical therapist by training and works in the public sector with disabled and permanently ill people, in addition to working with her husband in the family’s pain management and rehabilitation practice.

Sallinen and former Liiga player Mika Välilä were married in 2002 and divorced in early 2018. Their two sons, Emil Välilä (born 2003) and Elis Välilä (born 2005), play on the U18 and U16 teams of the Tappara ice hockey club respectively, the same junior organization in which their father developed.

Sallinen and osteopath Petteri Sallinen married in late 2018. They have a physical therapy practice in Sweden, in which each of them takes responsibility for one-half of patient care; Petteri focuses on alleviating patients’ pain and Riikka develops physical therapy regimens for rehabilitation. Petteri, a former film director, was previously married to actress and theater director Anu Hälvä; they divorced in early 2018, and have two children together.

Ice hockey career statistics

Regular season and playoffs

International

Awards and honours

Ice hockey

Other sports

References
Content in this article is translated from the existing Finnish Wikipedia article at :fi:Riikka Sallinen; see its history for attribution.

External links
 
 

1973 births
Living people
Sportspeople from Jyväskylä
Finnish women's ice hockey forwards
Finnish ice hockey coaches
Pesäpallo players
Finnish bandy players
Olympic bronze medalists for Finland
Olympic ice hockey players of Finland
Olympic medalists in ice hockey
Hockey Hall of Fame inductees
Ice hockey players at the 1998 Winter Olympics
Ice hockey players at the 2002 Winter Olympics
Ice hockey players at the 2014 Winter Olympics
Ice hockey players at the 2018 Winter Olympics
Medalists at the 1998 Winter Olympics
Medalists at the 2018 Winter Olympics
IIHF Hall of Fame inductees
Ice hockey players with retired numbers
Swedish Women's Hockey League coaches
HV71 Dam players
JYP Jyväskylä Naiset players
KalPa Naiset players
Finnish expatriate ice hockey people in Sweden
Finnish expatriate ice hockey players in Sweden
Finnish expatriate ice hockey players in Switzerland
Finnish expatriate ice hockey coaches